Creative Improvised Music Projects, usually abbreviated CIMP or C.I.M.P., is an American jazz record company and label. It is associated with Cadence Magazine and Cadence Jazz Records. The label is noted for its minimal use of electronic processing and its spare microphoning technique. Bob Rusch founded CIMP in 1995, with his son Marc Rusch as the recording engineer and his daughter Kara Rusch producing cover art.

The label recorded its first session in 1995 for an album that featured Evan Parker, Barry Guy, Paul Lytton, and Joe McPhee. From the beginning, it has concentrated on avant-garde jazz. Its catalogue includes Marshall Allen, Herb Robertson, Paul Smoker, Glenn Spearman, and Steve Swell. Most of its releases are recorded in its own studio in Rossie, New York.

Eighteen compilations of music released on the label have been released, titled the Cimposium series.

Artists

Aaron James
Adam Lane
Ahmed Abdullah
Akira Ando
Alex Blake
Alex Harding
Alex Horwitz
Allen Nelson
Alvin Benjamin Carter Jr.
Alvin Benjamin Carter Sr.
Anders Griffen
Andrei Strobert
Andrew Cheshire
Andrew Cyrille
Andrew Lamb
Andrew White
Andy Eulau
Andy Laster
Anthony Braxton
Ari Brown
Art Baron
Arthur Blythe
Arthur Harper
Assif Tsahar
Atu Harold Murray
Avram Fefer
Barry Altschul
Barry Guy
Ben Koen
Bern Nix
Bert Harris
Bhob Rainey
Bill Gagliardi
Bill Lowe
Bill Meek
Billy Bang
Billy Pierce
Blaise Siwula
Bob Butta
Bob Celusak
Bob Fraser
Bob Magnusson
Bob Marsh
Bob Pilkington
Bob Stewart
Bob Washington
Bobby Bradford
Bobby Few
Bobby Zankel
Brian Settles
Brandon Evans
Brett Allen
Brian Landrus
Brian Smith

Bruce Eisenbeil
Bryan Carrott
Burton Greene
Byard Lancaster
Calvin Hill
Carl Grubbs
Carlos Ward
Carmen Intorre
Casey Benjamin
Chad Taylor
Charles Burnham
Charles Eubanks
Charles Moffett
Charlie Kohlhase
Chris Dahlgren
Chris Jonas
Chris Kelsey
Chris Lightcap
Chris Matthay
Chris McCann
Chris Sullivan
Christopher Cauley
Claire Daly
Claude Lawrence
Clifford Barbaro
Cody Moffett
Craig McIver
Curt Warren
Damion Reid
Damon Short
Daniel Carter
Darrell Katz
Dave Burrell
Dave Hofstra
David Bindman
David Bond
David Brandt
David Eyges
David Haney
David Harris
David Murray
David Prentice
David Schnitter
David Taylor
David Wertman
David White
Denis Charles
Denman Maroney
Derrek Phillips
Devorah Day
Dom Minasi
Dominic Duval
Dominick Farinacci
Donald Robinson
Donald Smith
Donna Cumberbatch
Doug Webb
Drew Gress
Dwight James
Dylan Taylor
Ed Crockett
Ed Schuller
Ed Ware
Ed Watkins
Edgar Bateman
Edward Perraud
Ehran Elisha
Elliot Levin
Elliott Levin
Eric Hipp
Erik Torrente
Ernest Dawkins
Ernie Krivda
ESATrio
Ethan Mann
Evan Parker
Francois Grillot
Frank Lowe
Fred Hess
Fred Lonberg-Holm
Frode Gjerstad
Gebhard Ullmann
Geoff Mann
George Cartwright
George Cremaschi
George Garzone
George Schuller
Gerry Hemingway
Glenn Spearman
Grachan Moncur III
Greg Badolato
Greg Maker
Greg Millar
Gregg Bendian
Gregor Huebner
Hamiet Bluiett
Hands Indigo
Harold E. Smith
Harris Eisenstadt
Harvey Sorgen
Herb Robertson
Hilliard Greene
Hiroaki Honshuku
Howard Cooper
Howard Johnson
Hugh Ragin
Igal Foni
Ivo Perelman
J. Brunka
J. D. Allen
J. R. Mitchell
Jack Wright
James Finn
Jason Hwang
Jason Oettel
Jay Rosen
Jazz Composers Alliance Orchestra
Jean Derome
Jean-Luc Guionnet
Jeff Halsey
Jeff Lederer
Jeff Williams
Jemeel Moondoc
Jeremy Carlstedt
Jeremy Udden
Jesse Dulman
Jim Gray
Jim Mosher
Jim Odgren
Jimmy Halperin
Jimmy Weinstein
Jims Hobbs
Joe Daley
Joe Fiedler
Joe Fonda
Joe Giardullo
Joe McPhee
Joe Rosenberg
Joe Ruddick
John Bacon Jr.
John Bickerton
John Bollinger
John Carlson
John Gunther
John Hébert
John Heward
John Lockwood
John O'Gallagher
John Oswald
John Pierce
John Swana
John Tchicai
John Turner
Jon Hazilla
Jorge Sylvester
Joris Dudli
Joseph Bowie
Joseph Jarman
Joseph Scianni
Joy Rosen
Julian Priester
Kahil El'Zabar
Kahlil Kwame Bell
Kalaparusha Maurice McIntyre
Keiichi Hashimoto
Kelly Meashey
Kelvyn Bell
Ken Filiano
Ken Schaphorst
Ken Simon
Ken Wessel
Kevin Norton
Kevin O'Neil
Khan Jamal
Konrad Bauer
Ku-umba Frank Lacy
Kurt Kotheimer
Kyle Hernandez
Laura Andel
Lee Shaw
Leo Huppert
Lisle Ellis
Lonnie Solaway
Lou Grassi
Lucian Ban
Luqman Ali
Luther Gray
Luther Thomas
Mads Thorsen
Malachi Favors
Marc Edwards
Marc Pompe
Marc Sabatella
Marco Eneidi
Marilyn Crispell
Mark Dresser
Mark Feldman
Mark Helias
Mark Johnson
Mark Whitecage
Marshall Allen
Mary Anne Driscoll
Mary LaRose
Masa Kamaguchi
Masashi Harada
Masujaa
Mat Marucci
Matt Bauder
Matt Davis
Matt Engle
Matt Langley
Matt Lavelle
Matt Penman
Matt Wilson
Melani Dyer
Michael Attias
Michael Bisio
Michael Bocchicchio
Michael Carvin
Michael Logan
Michael Marcus
Michael Rabinowitz
Michael Taylor
Mike Bisio
Mike Bullock
Mike DeMicco
Mike Peipman
Mike Sarin
Nate Wooley
Ned Rothenberg
Newman Baker
Newman Taylor Baker
Nick Tountas
Nils Wogram
Noah Howard
Norma Zocher
Odean Pope
Okkyung Lee
Ori Kaplan
Patrick Brennan
Paul Dunmall
Paul Lytton
Paul Murphy
Paul Rogers
Paul Smoker
Perry Robinson
Pete Vinson
Peter Brötzmann
Peter Dominquez
Peter Kowald
Peter Valsamis
Pheeroan akLaff
Phil Haynes
Phil Scarff
Philipp Wachsmann
Phillip Johnston
Pierre Dorge
Prince Lasha
Pucci Jhones
Ralph Peterson, Jr.
Ras Moshe
Rashid Bakr
Ravish Momin
Ray Anderson
Reggie Nicholson
Rich Syracuse
Richard A. McGhee III
Richie Barshay
Rick Iannacone
Rick McLaughlin
Rob Brown
Rob Thomas
Robert Rusch
Ron Godale
Ron Horton
Ron Lawrence
Ron Miles
Ronnie Burrage
Rory Stuart
Rosella Washington
Rosie Hertlein
Roswell Rudd
Roy Campbell, Jr.
Russ Nolan
Rusty Jones
Ryan Sawyer
Sabir Mateen
Salim Washington
Sam Bardfeld
Samarai Celestial
Scott Neumann
Scott Rosenberg
Seth Meicht
Shawn McGloin
Shingo Okudaira
Sipho Robert Bellinger
Sonny Simmons
Soo-Jung Kae
Sophie Duner
Stephen Gauci
Steve Lehman
Steve Neil
Steve Novosel
Steve Salerno
Steve Swell
Steve Wallace
T.J. Graham
Takaaki Masuko
Taylor Ho Bynum
Ted Daniels
Thomas Borgmann
Thomas Ulrich
Tim Armacost
Tim Daisy
Tim Flood
Tim Mayer
Todd Margasak
Todd Nicholson
Tom Abbs
Tom DeSteno
Tom Varner
Tomas Ulrich
Tony Malaby
Trio X
Tristan Honsinger
Tyrone Brown
Tyrone Hill
Ursel Schlicht
Valery Ponomarev
Vijay Anderson
Vincent Chancey
Vinny Golia
Wade Barnes
Warren Senders
Warren Smith
Wilber Morris
Wilbur Morris
Will Connell
William Gagliardi
Winnien Dahlgren
Yuko Fujiyama
Zusaan Kali Fasteau

References

External links
 

American record labels
Jazz record labels